A Brake Standard Open (Micro-Buffet), often abbreviated to BSOT or BSO(T), is a type of railway carriage used by British Rail.

These coaches were converted from a Brake Standard Open (BSO), by replacing one passenger seating bay with a counter for serving food, and space for a trolley for light refreshments. The toilet was removed and the space converted to a steward's prep-room and store.

Two batches of coaches were converted, as shown below.

These coaches are no longer in scheduled main-line services, the last being withdrawn in the mid-1990s. However, several coaches from both Mk1 and Mk2 types have been preserved on heritage railways, or are used by charter companies. These are detailed below:

External links
Vintage Carriage Trust - contains details of preserved vehicles

British Rail coaching stock